Spirit of the Wind (also known as Attla) is a 1979 American Northern film directed by Ralph Liddle and starring Chief Dan George, Slim Pickens, Pius Savage, and George Clutesi.

Plot summary
The film is a semi-biographical story based upon the early life and rise to prominence of Native American dog musher George Attla, Jr. (1933–2015).  Attla, known as "the Huslia Hustler," took his nickname from one of his mentors, Jimmy Huntington, who first began winning races during Attla's childhood.  In recent generations, this nickname has become associated with Attla far more than with Huntington.  Attla was a leading star of the 1960s and 1970s in the sport of sprint dog sled racing.  He won the Fur Rendezvous World Championship race, held in Anchorage, Alaska, 10 times between 1958 and 1982.  He also won 8 championships in the Open North American Championship race, held in Fairbanks, Alaska.  In addition, despite his mushing experience being geared more towards sprint than distance racing, Attla competed in the inaugural Iditarod Trail Sled Dog Race in 1973, placing fifth.  In a 2011 interview, Attla spoke of the popularity of the Iditarod, and how sprint racing "is now a second-class sport" as a result.

The general theme of the story centered around Attla's rivalry with the other leading sprint competitors of the day, fellow Alaska Native Gareth Wright (the brother of political gadfly Don Wright and grandfather of modern-day dog musher Ramy Brooks) and Massachusetts musher Roland "Doc" Lombard, the preparations for an upcoming big race, and his first major race victory.

The movie was shot on location in Fairbanks, Alaska.  A number of local actors, including local Alaska Natives, University of Alaska Fairbanks professor Lee Salisbury, and KFAR disc jockey/newscaster Bill Walley, appear in minor roles.

Cast

References

External links 
 

1970s adventure films
1979 drama films
1979 films
Films set in Alaska
Films shot in Alaska
Films shot in Minnesota
Films about dogs
Mushing films
1970s English-language films
Northern (genre) films
American adventure drama films
1970s American films